Murfie is an American commercial music streaming service originally based in Madison, Wisconsin. Murfie members buy, sell, and trade compact discs and stream or download their contents. Members could also digitize and store CDs and LPs they sent from home to Murfie.

Murfie was featured in the Wall Street Journal, the New York Times, Fast Company, Time Magazine, and National Public Radio.

In 2012, Murfie became a member of Techstars.

In 2014, Murfie announced they had lossless FLAC streaming available on Sonos devices.

In November 2019, Murfie ceased operations.

In January 2020, the site's assets were acquired by Crossies LLC.

 John Fenley is the owner of both Murfie and Crossies.  John Fenley, Murfie, and Crossies business address is 2622 West 17 street, Pine Bluff AR, 71603.  John Fenley can also be found on Twitter, YouTube, and Twitch platforms under the moniker 'Pontifier'.

The Murfie/Crossies facility is approximately 218,952 square feet of industrial light manufacturing facility in the County seat of Jefferson County in the City of Pine Bluff, Arkansas.

According to an article by SARAH HAUER | MILWAUKEE JOURNAL SENTINEL, Crossies committed to the project of returning collections to those who had entrusted the Madison company with their music. An LLC set up after Murfie dissolved has been trying to return discs to customers. About 150,000 discs have been requested from a warehouse that is holding around 750,000, according to an email update from Murfie Customer Returns Service LLC, an independent organization set up to help customers get their music back.

References

External links
 

Companies based in Madison, Wisconsin
Companies based in Arkansas
Music streaming services
2019 disestablishments in Arkansas
American companies disestablished in 2019